{{Infobox bridge
| name          =
| native_name   = دیّورسو
| native_name_lang =
| image         = Road bridge over a river in Gilgit.jpg
| image_upright =
| alt           = A view of suspension bridge Danyore
| caption       =
| coordinates   = 
| os_grid_reference =
| carries       =
| crosses       =
| locale        =
| official_name = Bireno Pul
| other_name    = Pul-e-Sirat
| named_for     =  Jabir Ansar'
| owner         =
| maint         =
| heritage      =
| id            =
| id_type       = Simple suspension bridge
| website       =
| preceded      = Traditional raft
| followed      = New concrete bridge
| design        = Medium
| material      = Wooden span
| material1     = Metallic ropes
| material2     =
| length        = 510ft
| width         = 8ft
| height        =
| depth         =
| traversable   =
| towpath       = No
| mainspan      =
| number_spans  = 1
| piers_in_water=
| load          =
| clearance_above=
| clearance_below=
| lanes         = 1
| life          =
| num_track     =
| track_gauge   =
| structure_gauge=
| electrification=
| architect     =
| designer      =
| contracted_designer=Thekadar Birano
| winner        =
| engineering   = Traditional method
| builder       = 
| fabricator    =
| begin         =
| complete      =
| cost          =
| open          = 
| inaugurated   =
| rebuilt       = No
| collapsed     =
| closed        = Yes
| replaces      =
| replaced_by   =
| traffic       = Allowed for pedestrians
| toll          = No
| map_type      =
| map_relief    =
| map_dot_label =
| map_image     =
| map_size      =
| map_alt       =
| map_caption   =
}}
The Danyore Suspension Bridge is in the Gilgit-Baltistan region of Pakistan, and is one of the oldest makeshift suspension bridges in the region. The bridge connects Danyor to the premises of the Karakoram University across the River Hunza. Currently the bridge is closed for vehicles; only pedestrians and motorcyclists are allowed to pass through. Winds coming from northwest of the valley set the suspension bridge to swing inducing minute resonances, and it is therefore declared unsafe for normal traffic. In 2013 a two-way concrete bridge was constructed beside it that is being used as an alternative.

 History 
 Before the construction of the suspension bridge of Danyor there used to be a boat which is locally called Jaalo (a traditional raft for the passage crossing rivers and lakes) used to cross the Hunza River. The bridge was constructed in mid-sixties. The Danyore side of the bridge is connected to a tunnel (locally called core'') that was dug by the then-residents of Danyore without any engineering tools and equipments almost a decade later.

See also 

 Damaged Chinese Bridge Danyore

References

External links
 Danyore, Gilgit

Simple suspension bridges
Bridges in Pakistan
Footbridges
Buildings and structures in Gilgit-Baltistan